Moravița is a commune in Timiș County, Romania. It is composed of four villages: Dejan, Gaiu Mic, Moravița (commune seat) and Stamora Germană. Moravița is the site of a rail and road border crossing with Serbia.

History 
The first recorded mention of Moravița dates from 1333. Hungarian historian , analyzing the document Incipium rationes decimes sexenallis coletae in Hungaria an ano 1332 ad 1337, found today in the Vatican Library, concludes that Mora (Mura), which appears in this document, refers to Moravița. Ortvay claims that at that time the settlement had a Catholic church. In 1337, due to a flood of the Moravița brook, the locals from Mora were to retreat on the hills of Butin, then forested.

Documents from 1492, 1494 and 1496 speak about the existence of two distinct localities: Tothmura ("Slovak Mura", inhabited by Slovaks, present-day Stamora Germană) and Magyarmura ("Hungarian Mura", inhabited by Hungarians, present-day Moravița). The two estates were owned by Mihály Csáky's family, bought from Miklós Mathko, who settled Hungarian families here in order to harness the fertile lands. In the mid-15th century, Banat fell under Turkish rule, but Moravița continued its existence. In 1597, several Romanian families from Krassó County settled in Moravița. It was then called Morawa. 

During 1722, 1775 and 1784–1787, Moravița was settled in three waves with Germans, with the most consistent one between 1784–1787. Zipser Germans coming from Alsace, Lorraine and Luxembourg built 145 new houses here. At the time of colonization the village was mixed (Romanians, Germans and Serbs). Romanians and Serbs are forced to move to the neighboring villages of Dejan (Serbs) and Gherman (Romanians), and their Orthodox church (built in 1782) is handed over to Catholics, who will hold services in it until 1911, when they will build a new Catholic church. The old church was demolished in 1920 and the town hall was built from the resulting materials. 

Moravița was given market rights in 1839. During this time, Moravița also received a military garrison in which a Uhlan squadron was stationed. The inauguration of the Timișoara–Moravița–Buziaș railway in 1858 boosted the economic activity and the development of the village.

77 locals, mostly Germans, died during World War I. After the war, the German delegation to the Paris Peace Conference would demand that the entire Banat be incorporated into Romania. The final border was decided later, and on 5 February 1924, the border rectification between Yugoslavia and Romania was made, through which Moravița passed into Romania. The interwar period marked a progress in cultural life, as in 1935 Moravița had two choirs and a brass band, a steam mill and a siphon factory, a people's bank, a post office and a train station.

Demographics 

Moravița had a population of 2,289 inhabitants at the 2011 census, down 4% from the 2002 census. Most inhabitants are Romanians (83.22%), larger minorities being represented by Hungarians (4.63%), Roma (3.84%), Germans (1.75%) and Serbs (1.35%). For 4.46% of the population, ethnicity is unknown. By religion, most inhabitants are Orthodox (77.63%), but there are also minorities of Roman Catholics (12.06%) and Pentecostals (3.49%). For 4.54% of the population, religious affiliation is unknown.

References 

Communes in Timiș County
Localities in Romanian Banat
Romania–Serbia border crossings
Place names of Slavic origin in Romania